Blue of Noon is an erotic novella by Georges Bataille. Although Bataille completed the work in 1935, it was not published until Jean-Jacques Pauvert did so in 1957. (Pauvert previously published the writings of the Marquis de Sade.) Urizen Books published Harry Mathews' English-language translation in 1978. The book deals with necrophilia.

Plot summary
Henri Troppmann goes from his sick-bed in Paris to Barcelona before the Spanish Civil War in time to witness a Catalan General Strike. He is torn between three different women, all of whom arrive in the city at that time. One of them, Lazare, is a Marxist Jew and political activist, who is preparing herself for prospective torture and martyrdom at the hand of General Francisco Franco's troops if she is captured. "Dirty" (or Dorothea) is an incontinent, unkempt alcoholic who repeatedly has sex with Troppmann. Xénie is a young woman who had previously nursed him to health during his violent fever in Paris.

The novel is introduced by a scene of extreme degeneracy in a London hotel room, followed by the narrator's description of a dreamlike encounter with 'the Commendatore' (English: "the Commander"), who in the Don Juan myth is the father of one of Don Juan's victims, and whose statue returns at the end of the story to drag Don Juan down to hell for his sins.  Troppmann has to choose between the abject Dirty and her associations of sex, disease, excrement and decay, the politically engaged Lazare, and her ethical values of commitment, resistance and endurance, and Xénie, who has outlived her usefulness. While looking at Lazare beneath a tree, Troppmann realises that he respects her for her social conscience, but also sees her as a rat, and chooses Dirty instead, whilst sending Xénie off with a friend, who is subsequently killed in the street.  He travels with Dirty to Trier, the home-town of Karl Marx, where the two copulate in the mud on a cliff overlooking a candle-lit graveyard. They see a Hitler Youth group, lending Dirty  a vision of the war to come and their probable deaths. Troppmann leaves her to return to Paris.

In popular culture
The book can be seen briefly in the music video of French singer Alain Bashung's song Résidents De La République.

References

Bibliography
Georges Bataille: Le Bleu du Ciel: Roman: Paris: J.Pauvert: 1957.
Georges Bataille: Blue of Noon: London: Penguin: 2001: 

1935 French novels
French erotic novels
French novellas
Novels set in Barcelona
Works by Georges Bataille